Magnus Lövdén (born 6 June 1970) is a Swedish sailor. He competed at the 1996 Summer Olympics and the 2000 Summer Olympics.

References

External links
 

1970 births
Living people
Swedish male sailors (sport)
Olympic sailors of Sweden
Sailors at the 1996 Summer Olympics – Tornado
Sailors at the 2000 Summer Olympics – Tornado
Sportspeople from Lund